Samuel Richards of Boston, Massachusetts was a long distance swimmer. He won the Boston Light Swim in 1911 and in 1912. In 1913, he swam from the Charlestown Bridge to the Boston Light and back, a distance of about 24 miles.

Richards was a member of the L Street Brownies, a polar bear club based in South Boston.

References

American male swimmers
Sportspeople from Boston
Swimmers from Massachusetts
Year of birth missing
Year of death missing